Georgia's 108th House District elects one member of the Georgia House of Representatives. 
Its current representative is Democrat Jasmine Clark.

The district includes the Atlanta suburbs of Lilburn and Mountain Park.

Elected representatives

References 

Georgia House of Representatives districts
Gwinnett County, Georgia